The Mansu Hill Grand Monument (Chosŏn'gŭl: 만수대대기념비; Hanja: 萬壽臺大紀念碑) is a complex of monuments in Pyongyang, North Korea. There are 229 figures in all, commemorating the history of the revolutionary struggle of the Korean people, and especially their leaders. The central part of the monument consists of two  bronze statues of Kim Il-sung and Kim Jong-il.

History
In April of 1972, Kim Jong-il erected the monument in honor of Kim Il-sung's 60th birthday. The monument feature the Great Leader alone overlooking Pyongyang. Five years later, the statue was covered in gold leaf. Soon thereafter, this gold plating was removed after a visit from Deng Xiaoping, who, after seeing the monument, expressed displeasure with how Chinese aid was being spent.

Following Kim Jong-il's death in 2011, a similar statue of him was erected on the north side of Kim Il-sung. At the same time, Kim Il-sung's statue was altered to portray him at a later age and smiling. Kim Il-sung's original Mao suit was also replaced as Western-style suit. The statue of Kim Jong-il initially featured a long coat but it was promptly changed to his signature parka. South Korean sources have estimated the cost of the additional statue at $10 million, with North Korean workers working overseas being ordered to donate $150 each towards the monument.

Description

Behind the central statues is a wall of the Korean Revolution Museum building, displaying a mosaic mural showing a scene from Mount Paektu, considered to be the sacred mountain of revolution. On either side of the statues, leading away from the building, are two monuments consisting of statues of different soldiers, workers, and farmers in their anti-Japanese revolutionary struggle and socialist revolution. The long line of human figures depicted on them are on average 5 meters tall. 

An official North Korean website describes it thus:

All visitors to the site, both locals and foreigners, are expected to bow and leave flowers in order to show respect. Photos of the statues are permitted, but the photos must capture the statues in their entirety. Close-up photos of any part of the leader's statues are strictly forbidden.

References

External links

Monuments and memorials in North Korea
Buildings and structures in Pyongyang
Tourist attractions in Pyongyang
Statues of heads of government
Outdoor sculptures in North Korea
Statues of presidents
Statues in North Korea
1972 establishments in North Korea
1972 sculptures
Colossal statues
20th-century architecture in North Korea